The Bridal is an 1837 tragedy by the Irish writer James Sheridan Knowles. It premiered at the Theatre Royal, Haymarket in London's West End on 26 June 1837 with a cast that included William Macready as Melantius, Edward William Elton as Amintor, Charles Selby as Calianaz and Mary Huddart as Evadne. It is inspired by the Jacobean play The Maid's Tragedy by Francis Beaumont and John Fletcher. In 1843 it appeared at the Park Theatre in New York with Macready repising his role.

References

Bibliography
  Burwick, Frederck Goslee, Nancy Moore & Hoeveler Diane Long . The Encyclopaedia of Romantic Literature. John Wiley & Sons,  2012.
 Nicoll, Allardyce. A History of Early Nineteenth Century Drama 1800-1850. Cambridge University Press, 1930.

1837 plays
West End plays
Irish plays
British plays
Plays by James Sheridan Knowles